The Mambi-1 AMR is a semi-automatic anti-materiel rifle designed and manufactured in Cuba. It was named after the Mambises, who were rebel soldiers that fought against the Kingdom of Spain during the Cuban War of Independence (1895–1898).

History
Little is known about this weapon, as it has received little attention in mainstream media.

A sniper rifle variant, the Mambi-2 SR was developed soon after the completion of the anti-material rifle. It fires 12.7×108mm rounds.

Design
The Mambi was designed to be used against a variety of soft-skinned ground vehicles, small boats, and even helicopters. It uses the powerful Soviet 14.5×114mm round. The Mambi appears to be a Bullpup since its 5-round magazine and action are placed behind the trigger group. It is fitted with a muzzle brake to help reduce recoil created by the round it fires. The rifle weighs approximately 14 kg and its design is similar to the Barrett M82A2.

The weapon is designed to be fired from a prone position due to large amounts of recoil.

Conflicts
The Mambi AMR has been used in the following conflicts:
 South African Border War
 Angolan Civil War

See also
 Barret M82
 List of bullpup firearms
 List of sniper rifles
 PTRS-41
 PTRD

References

Semi-automatic rifles
Bullpup rifles
Military equipment of Cuba
14.5×114mm anti-materiel rifles